Better Off Wet can refer to:

Television 
 "Better Off Wet (Dexter's Laboratory)", an episode of Dexter's Laboratory
 "Better Off Wet (Brandy & Mr. Whiskers)", an episode of Brandy & Mr. Whiskers